Expressway S86 - the section of national road 86 joining Katowice (onramp Roździeńskiego) and Sosnowiec (onramp built Pogoń) built in 1978-1986 of length  5.9 km (3,66 mil). This road was not a part of express road network plans, however the plans have been changed in October 2015. Being the main route of traffic between Zagłębie Dąbrowskie and Upper Silesia expressway S86 is a high traffic road, which is known for frequent traffic jams. According to General Traffic Measurement conducted by GDDKiA in 2010 it carries heaviest traffic in Poland with average of 104339 vehicles daily and from 2015 second with the heaviest traffic in Poland.

References

Expressways in Poland